The Visita de San Juan Bautista Londó was a Catholic visita located at the Cochimí settlement of Londó in what is now Loreto Municipality, Baja California Sur, Mexico. The visita was founded by Jesuit missionaries Juan María Salvatierra and Francisco María Piccolo in 1699 as an extension of Misión de Nuestra Señora de Loreto Conchó.

History

The first permanent stone structures at Londó were first constructed in 1705.

By 1750, the Cochimí population of the visita had been relocated to Misión San José de Comondú. Ruins now attest to the former presence of the visita.

See also

 List of Jesuit sites
 Spanish missions in Baja California Sur

References
 Vernon, Edward W. 2002. Las Misiones Antiguas: The Spanish Missions of Baja California, 1683–1855. Viejo Press, Santa Barbara, California.

Missions in Baja California Sur
Loreto Municipality (Baja California Sur)
1699 establishments in New Spain
1705 establishments in New Spain